is a Japanese variety show with members of idol group SKE48 that premiered on Nippon Television on October 11, 2011.

Cast
 Jurina Matsui 
 Rena Matsui
 Akane Takayanagi 
 Masayasu Wakabayashi
 Jiro Sato

References

External links
 

2011 Japanese television series debuts
Japanese variety television shows
Nippon TV original programming
SKE48